Souleymane Isaak Touré (born 28 March 2003) is a French professional footballer who plays as a defender for Ligue 1 club Auxerre, on loan from Marseille.

Club career
On 11 July 2020, Touré signed his first professional contract with Le Havre. He made his professional debut in a 1–0 Ligue 2 win over Amiens on 29 August.

On 30 June 2022, Touré signed for Ligue 1 side Marseille on a five-year contract. On 3 January 2023, Touré joined AJ Auxerre on loan until the end of the season.

International career
Born in France, Touré is of Ivorian descent. He is a youth international for France.

References

External links
 
 

2003 births
Living people
People from Gonesse
Footballers from Val-d'Oise
French footballers
France youth international footballers
French sportspeople of Ivorian descent
Black French sportspeople
Association football defenders
Le Havre AC players
Olympique de Marseille players
AJ Auxerre players
Championnat National 3 players
Ligue 2 players
Ligue 1 players